Ashley Fuller Olsen (born June 13, 1986) is an American businesswoman, fashion designer and former actress. She began her acting career at the age of nine months, sharing the role of Michelle Tanner with her twin sister Mary-Kate Olsen in the television sitcom Full House (1987–1995). They also starred in numerous films together.

In 1993, the production company Dualstar Entertainment Group was founded, which produced a long string of TV movies and direct-to-video releases featuring the girls; they starred in Passport to Paris (1999), Our Lips Are Sealed (2000), Winning London (2001), Holiday in the Sun (2001) and in the television series, So Little Time (2001–2002). They starred in, Getting There (2002), When in Rome (2002), The Challenge (2003) and made cameos in Charlie's Angels: Full Throttle (2003). The last film she starred in with her twin sister was New York Minute (2004). She continued with her acting career independently, appearing with a few guest-star roles in films and in a music video.

In March 2012, both Mary-Kate and Ashley officially indicated their interest to retire as actresses in order to focus on their careers in the fashion industry. She and her twin sister co-founded luxury fashion brand The Row, lifestyle brand Elizabeth and James, and more affordable fashion lines Olsenboye and StyleMint. They co-authored a book, Influence, featuring interviews with fashion designers that have inspired their fashion lines. They are members of the Council of Fashion Designers of America.

Early life and education
Ashley Fuller Olsen was born on June 13, 1986, in Sherman Oaks, California. She is the daughter of Jarnette "Jarnie" Olsen (née Jones; b. 1954), a personal manager, and David "Dave" Olsen, a real estate developer and mortgage banker. Along with her twin, Mary-Kate, they have an older brother Trent, a younger sister and actress Elizabeth, and younger half-siblings Taylor and Jake (from their father's second marriage). Olsen's parents divorced in 1996. The twins and their siblings have Norwegian ancestry while their mother is of French, German and Italian ancestry.

Olsen attended the Campbell Hall School in Los Angeles. After graduating from Campbell Hall in 2004, she and Mary-Kate went on to attend New York University's Gallatin School of Individualized Study.

Acting career

Career beginnings
She began her acting career at the age of nine months old when she and her twin sister, Mary-Kate Olsen, were hired to share the role of Michelle Tanner on the popular television sitcom Full House (1987–1995).

She starred alongside Mary-Kate in the films, To Grandmother's House We Go (1992), Double, Double, Toil and Trouble (1993), How the West Was Fun (1994), It Takes Two (1995), Billboard Dad (1998) and the television series, Two of a Kind (1998–1999).

Dualstar

In the 1990s, associates of Olsen and her twin sister acted in recognition of their marketing potential, building a production company around them called Dualstar Entertainment Group, which produced a successful long string of TV movies and direct-to-video releases featuring the girls. They starred in Passport to Paris (1999), Switching Goals (1999), Our Lips Are Sealed (2000), Winning London (2001), Holiday in the Sun (2001) and the television series, So Little Time (2001–2002).

She and her twin sister became household names and a popular figures in the preteen market during the late 1990s and early 2000s, with her likeness seen in clothes, books, fragrances, magazines, movies, and posters, among others. There were fashion dolls of her made by Mattel from 2000 to 2005. They also starred in the films Getting There (2002), When in Rome (2002), The Challenge (2003) and made cameos in Charlie's Angels: Full Throttle (2003). In 2004, the sisters appeared in their theatrical light-hearted romantic comedy film, New York Minute. It would be their last film together, as well as Ashley's last acting role. Mary-Kate continued with her acting career independently, appearing in a few films and shows, with her final acting project being in the 2011 horror movie Beastly.

In 2004, upon the twins' 18th birthday, they became co-presidents of their company Dualstar (created in 1993 following the success of Full House), the brand currently selling in over 3,000 stores in America and 5,300 stores worldwide.

Retirement
In 2007, when Mary-Kate and Ashley were 21, they said that if they got involved in movies together again it would be as producers.

In 2009, Olsen contemplated returning to acting and said, "Never say never."

She made appearances in the films The Jerk Theory (2009) and I'm Still Here (2010).

In March 2012, both Mary-Kate and Ashley Olsen indicated their interest to retire as actresses in order to focus on their careers in fashion. The twins felt that their futures were in fashion, and not in acting. They discussed wanting to open a store as one of their future fashion-based endeavors.

In October 2013, she appeared in the music video for "City of Angels" by Thirty Seconds to Mars.

In 2015, it was announced that John Stamos had signed on with Netflix to produce and co-star in Fuller House, a spin-off of Full House that would reunite the original cast members. In May of that year, Mary-Kate and Ashley originally announced that they would not reprise their role as Michelle Tanner; however, two months later in July, according to Netflix's Ted Sarandos, the Olsen twins were "teetering" on an agreement to join the series. The twins eventually declined to join the cast of Fuller House, with Ashley saying she would not feel comfortable in front of the camera after a 12-year absence from acting and Mary-Kate saying the timing was bad. Nickelodeon acquired the rights to Mary-Kate and Ashley's video library in 2015.

Net worth and influence
She and her sister were jointly ranked number three on the VH1 program 100 Greatest Child Stars. Ashley and her twin Mary-Kate's success has been marked by their inclusion on every Forbes The Celebrity 100 list since 2002. In 2007, Forbes ranked the twins as the eleventh-richest women in entertainment, with an estimated combined net worth of $100 million. Forbes had the twins on their 30 Under 30: All-Star Alumni list in 2017.

Fashion career

Career beginnings
Following a high volume of public interest in their fashion choices, Mary-Kate and Ashley collaborated on a series of fashion lines available to the public. They released clothing in Walmart stores across America for girls ages 4 to 14, as well as a beauty line called Mary-Kate and Ashley: Real Fashion for Real Girls.

In 2004, they made news by signing a pledge to allow all the workers that sew their line of clothing in Bangladesh full maternity leave. The National Labor Committee, which organized the pledge, later praised the twins for their commitment to worker rights.

Business and philanthropy
The idea for The Row started as a personal project in 2005 when Ashley Olsen challenged herself to create a perfect T-shirt. She tested the design on a variety of women of all body shapes and ages in an attempt to find a "commonality in fit and attitude."

By 2006, the sisters had created a 7-piece collection that included the T-shirt, a pair of cotton sateen leggings, and a cashmere wool tank dress. Barneys New York bought the entire first collection. The brand has expanded to include ready-to-wear, resort, handbags, sunglasses, and shoes. 

In 2006, they were selected as the faces of the upscale fashion line Badgley Mischka.

In 2008, Mary-Kate and Ashley published Influence, a book featuring interviews with fashion designers that have inspired their fashion lines.

In 2011, the sisters collaborated with TOMS Shoes to design footwear for children without shoes in more than 20 countries worldwide.

As adults, Mary-Kate and Ashley have devoted much of their attention to the world of fashion. They head a couture fashion label, The Row, as well as the Elizabeth and James, Olsenboye, and StyleMint retail collections.

Mary-Kate and Ashley designed an Olsenboye change purse in 2011 and donated the money to "Pennies From Heaven".

In October 2012, the twins won the WSJ magazine Innovator of The Year Award.

In early 2013, they launched an Elizabeth and James perfume.

Ashley Olsen has appeared on best-dressed lists.

The Olsens are members of the Council of Fashion Designers of America, CFDA a not-for-profit trade association of over 450 prominent American fashion and accessory designers. They are now the creative directors for the Italian fashion shoe brand Superga.

Personal life
In February 2005, Olsen filed a $40 million lawsuit against tabloid magazine National Enquirer for depicting her as being involved in a drug scandal. Later on that year in October, the tabloid eventually apologized to Olsen and stated it did not intend to suggest that she was involved in the scandal.

Olsen began a relationship with artist Louis Eisner in October 2017. Eisner is the son of Eric Eisner, former president of The Geffen Company and a noted philanthropist who founded the Young Eisner Scholars. In July 2019, Olsen sparked engagement rumors after she was spotted wearing a ring on her finger. They married on December 28, 2022 in Bel Air, Los Angeles.

Olsen has dated former Columbia University quarterback and now producer Matt Kaplan, restaurateur Scott Sartiano, actor Jared Leto, cyclist Lance Armstrong, actor Justin Bartha, and financier Richard Sachs.

Filmography

Awards and nominations

References

Further reading
 Mary-Kate Olsen and Ashley Olsen, with Damon Romine. Mary-Kate and Ashley: Our Story: Mary-Kate & Ashley Olsen's Official Biography. HarperCollins, 2000. .

External links

 The Row

1986 births
20th-century American actresses
21st-century American actresses
21st-century American writers
21st-century American women writers
Actresses from Los Angeles
21st-century American businesspeople
American child actresses
American film actresses
American people of English descent
American people of Norwegian descent
American television actresses
American voice actresses
Fraternal twin actresses
Living people
New York University Gallatin School of Individualized Study alumni
Olsen family
People from Sherman Oaks, Los Angeles
American twins
21st-century American businesswomen